The 1997 Team Ice Racing World Championship was the 19th edition of the Team World Championship. The final was held on 1/2 March, 1997, in Berlin, in Germany. Russia won the title.

Final classification

Semi-final 
Saransk - 18/19 Jan

See also 
 1997 Individual Ice Speedway World Championship
 1997 Speedway World Team Cup in classic speedway
 1997 Speedway Grand Prix in classic speedway

References 

Ice speedway competitions
World